Barrier Highway is a highway in South Australia and New South Wales, and is designated part of route A32. The name of the highway is derived from the Barrier Ranges, an area of moderately high ground in the far west of New South Wales, through which the highway traverses.

Route
Barrier Highway branches off Horrocks Highway at Giles Corner, between Riverton and Tarlee, and heads northeast, crossing the border into New South Wales and passing through Broken Hill. It continues further east to Wilcannia where it crosses the Darling River, past Cobar to eventually end in Nyngan where it joins Mitchell Highway. The area traversed by the highway is remote and very sparsely settled.

History
The passing of the Main Roads Act of 1924 through the Parliament of New South Wales provided for the declaration of Main Roads, roads partially funded by the State government through the Main Roads Board (later the Department of Main Roads, and eventually Transport for NSW). Barrier Highway was declared (as Main Road No. 8) on 8 August 1928, from the intersection with North-Western Highway (today Mitchell Highway) in Nyngan, via Cobar, Willcannia, and Broken Hill, to the border with South Australia; with the passing of the Main Roads (Amendment) Act of 1929 to provide for additional declarations of State Highways and Trunk Roads, this was amended to State Highway 8 on 8 April 1929.

The highway was fully sealed in October 1972.

The passing of the Roads Act of 1993 through the Parliament of New South Wales updated road classifications and the way they could be declared within New South Wales. Under this act, Barrier Highway today retains its declaration as Highway 8, from Nyngan to the state border with South Australia.

Barrier Highway was signed National Route 32 across its entire length in 1955. With both states' conversion to their newer alphanumeric systems in 1998 and 2013, its former route number was updated to A32 for the highway within South Australia in 1998, and within New South Wales in 2013.

Major intersections

See also

 Highways in Australia
 List of highways in New South Wales
 List of highways in South Australia

References

Far West (New South Wales)
Highways in New South Wales
Highways in South Australia